FabricLive.53 is a 2010 DJ mix album by Drop the Lime. The album was released as part of the FabricLive Mix Series.

Track listing
  Supra1 - Ghoster - Trouble & Bass
  Nouveau Yorican - Jackit (Drop the Lime Remix) - Mixmash
  Melé - Bombay (Nadastrom Remix) - Mixpak Records
  Egyptrixx - Everybody Bleeding - Night Slugs
  Drop the Lime - Thwomp Stomp - Trouble & Bass
  WAFA - Ewid Disco - Grizzly
  Drop the Lime - Hot Sauce Grillz - Trouble & Bass
  Maurice - This is Acid - Casablanca / Trax
  Untold - Anaconda - Hessle Audio
  Autoerotique - Bubonic (Drop the Lime Remix) - Dim Mak / Downtown
  Berou & Canblaster - Terence Hill (French Fries Remix) - unreleased
  Slick Wick Crew - 911 VIP - Trouble & Bass
  Drop the Lime - Sex Sax (Club Mix) - Trouble & Bass
  Bill Haley & His Comets - (We're Gonna) Rock Around the Clock - Geffen
  The Strangeloves - I Want Candy - Sony
  Foamo - Centavo - Fat! Records
  Zombies for Monkey - Kolkata (Sticky Version) - Trouble & Bass
  Sam Tiba - Barbie Weed - Top Billin
  Mosca - Square One (L-Vis 1990 Remix) - Night Slugs
  Adonis - No Way Back - Trax
  Femme en Fourrure - Dirty Blonde (Drop the Lime Remix) - Discobelle
  Tom Piper & Blaze Tripp - Brrrap! - Bigger than Barry / No Frills
  Baobinga ft. DJ Nasty - State of Ghetto Jackin' (TRG Remix) - Trouble & Bass
  AC Slater ft. Drop the Lime - Calm Down Part 3 - Trouble & Bass
  Little Jinder - Youth Blood (Villa Remix) - Trouble & Bass
  Drop the Lime ft. Carrie Wilds - Set me Free (Reso Remix) - Trouble & Bass

References

External links
Fabric: FabricLive.53

Fabric (club) albums
2010 compilation albums